Daniel Ross Moskos (born April 28, 1986) is an American former Major League Baseball left-handed pitcher who played for the Pittsburgh Pirates in 2011, and is currently the assistant pitching coach for the Chicago Cubs of Major League Baseball (MLB).

Amateur career 
Daniel attended Damien High School in La Verne, California along with running back Ian Johnson, former NFL wide receiver Freddie Brown, and soccer forward Chukwudi Chijindu. After high school, he attended Clemson University and played college baseball for the Clemson Tigers. In 2005, he played collegiate summer baseball with the Cotuit Kettleers of the Cape Cod Baseball League.

Professional career

Pittsburgh Pirates
The Pittsburgh Pirates selected Moskos with the fourth overall pick of the 2007 MLB draft. He signed with the Pirates for a $2.475 million signing bonus on July 17, 2007.

After placing pitcher Evan Meek on the 15-day DL with right shoulder tendinitis, the Pirates called Moskos up to the majors for the first time on April 30, 2011. On that same night, he made his Major League debut, pitching one scoreless inning in relief against the Colorado Rockies. On May 22 he was optioned back to their Triple A team, the Indianapolis Indians. Less than a week later on May 28, Moskos was recalled to Pittsburgh due to Joe Beimel going on the 15-day DL with shoulder tightness. In 31 games in the majors, he was 1–1 with a 2.96 ERA.

Chicago White Sox
On July 6, 2012, Moskos was claimed off waivers by the Chicago White Sox. He pitched for the Charlotte Knights in 2012 and 2013. On June 23, 2013, he was released.

EDA Rhinos
He finished the 2013 season with the EDA Rhinos in the Chinese Professional Baseball League.

Later career
On November 18, 2013, Moskos signed a minor league contract with the Los Angeles Dodgers, including an invitation to major league camp. Later he was assigned to the AAA Albuquerque Isotopes, where he had a 6.52 ERA in nine games before being released on May 7, 2014.

In 2015, while was a free agent, Moskos was suspended for 50 games following a positive test for a banned substance. Moskos played in the Mexican Professional Winter League in Navojoa, Sonora for Mayos de Navojoa. In 24 games, he posted a 2–1 record with nine saves.

On March 1, 2016, Moskos signed a minor league deal with the San Diego Padres. In December 2016, Moskos signed a minor league contract with the Chicago Cubs.

On April 4, 2017, Moskos signed with the Lancaster Barnstormers of the Atlantic League of Professional Baseball. He became a free agent after the 2017 season.

On April 26, 2018, Moskos signed with the Toros de Tijuana of the Mexican Baseball League. He retired from professional baseball following the season.

Post-playing career
As of 2019, Moskos was working as a throwing trainer at Driveline Baseball. In 2020, Moskos was the pitching coach for the Class-A Charleston River Dogs of the New York Yankees organization. In 2021, Moskos served as the pitching coach for the Somerset Patriots.

The Chicago Cubs hired Moskos as their assistant pitching coach after the 2021 season.

References

External links
, or CPBL
MiLB.com report
On the Pirates: If only Wieters had been drafted ...

1986 births
Living people
Albuquerque Isotopes players
Altoona Curve players
American expatriate baseball players in Mexico
Baseball players from California
Charlotte Knights players
Clemson Tigers baseball players
Cotuit Kettleers players
Gulf Coast Pirates players
Indianapolis Indians players
Lancaster Barnstormers players
Lynchburg Hillcats players
Major League Baseball pitchers
Mayos de Navojoa players
Mexican League baseball pitchers
Pittsburgh Pirates players
Sportspeople from Los Angeles County, California
State College Spikes players
Toros de Tijuana players
People from Greenville, South Carolina